Andrew Tompkins is the lead vocalist and bassist for the Australian doom metal band Paramaecium, which was considered to be the biggest Christian doom metal band.

Andrew has a daughter named Enara. Tompkins' cousin is Mark Orr, former drummer of Paramaecium.

Tompkins has also written a book entitled "Within the Ancient Forest". The Paramaecium album of the same name was based on this novel.

When Tompkins was asked whether or not he believed in Christianity anymore, he stated "...As to whether I'm a practicing Christian, I usually tell people I'm a practicing Christian but not a believing Christian."

Biography

Science career

At the end of 1994 Andrew had completed a Bachelor of Science degree with Honours in Anatomy and went on to work as a research scientist in the fields of bone marrow transplantation and reproductive immunology; a field in which he has published research in the leading US reproduction journal.

In 1998 Tompkins completed a Master of Bioethics degree specialising in the moral ramifications of gene therapy with a thesis which examined the question: "Should parents alter the genes of their children?"

Paramaecium

In 1993 Paramaecium released their debut album Exhumed of the Earth, which was considered to be one of the greatest Christian doom metal albums of the time. After the success of its previous album, the band proceeded to release the concept album Within the Ancient Forest, based on a book written by the band's vocalist Andrew Tompkins. According to Doom-metal.com, Paramaecium "are the only Christian death doom band that made it to the top of the genre." After the success of the previous two albums Paramaecium released A Time to Mourn in 1999 which received minimal attention. In 2004 Paramaecium released their last album Echoes from the Ground which saw a return to their heavier roots. After their last album Paramaecium decided to disband the current band and form the new band "InExordium", they then proceeded to attend the Nordic Fest '06 as Paramaecium for the very last time.

InExordium
After Paramaecium "Disbanded", the band formed InExordium with a new guitarist. InExordium recorded and released their self-titled album in 2008. Jason De Ron, Paramaecium's guitarist, left the band in 2009 and was replaced by Sheldon D'Costa. InExordium disbanded in 2013, with D'Costa and Drummer Jayson Sherlock formed the band Revulsed.

Discography
Paramaecium
Silent Carnage (demo, 1991)
Exhumed of the Earth (1993)
Within the Ancient Forest (1996)
Repentance (EP, 1996)
A Time to Mourn (1999)
Echoes from the Ground (2004)

inExordium
 inExordium (2008)

Guest appearances
 Mortification (1991) & Scrolls of the Megilloth (1992) by Mortification

Production
 Scrolls of the Megilloth by Mortification (1992; Artwork, Layout)
 The Anatomy of Melancholy by My Silent Wake (2007; Photography)

References

External links
Paramaecium's official website
InExordium's official website

Australian anatomists
Australian atheists
Australian ethicists
Australian former Christians
Australian heavy metal bass guitarists
Australian heavy metal singers
Australian immunologists
Australian performers of Christian music
Bioethicists
Living people
Monash University alumni
Paramaecium members
Year of birth missing (living people)